Bernhard Kellermann (4 March 1879, Fürth, Kingdom of Bavaria – 17 October 1951) was a German author and poet.

Life 

Bernhard Kellermann enrolled in 1899 at Technical University Munich initially in general studies, but later focused on German literature and painting.
Beginning in 1904 he built a reputation as a novelist with early works such as Yester and Li, and reached extraordinary success through 1939 with 183 printings.

The novel Ingeborg (1906) achieved an impressive 131 printings (until 1939).

In the years before World War I his novels were published following journeys in the United States and Japan.
His novel Das Meer (The Sea) was made into film by Peter Paul Felner and Sofar-Film-Produktion GmbH, featuring prominent film stars.
His main work was Der Tunnel in 1913. It was highly successful for both him and his publisher, S. Fischer Verlag:  circulation exceeded one million, and the work was translated into 25 languages.
Kellermann's works became more critical of society and directly related to real-world events; his previous writings were marked with impressionism and prose.
During World War I, Kellermann worked as a correspondent for the Berliner Tageblatt [Berlin's Daily Journal], one of Berlin's most influential newspapers, and published several war reports.

In 1920, his novel Der 9. November (The Ninth of November) appeared, which argued critically against the behavior of soldiers and officers in relation to the people. This book doomed Kellermann during the Nazi era.

Beginning in 1922 he produced numerous novellas and short stories.
In 1926 Kellermann became a member of the Prussian poet academy, from which he was excluded 1933. In 1926 he divorced Lene Schneider-Kainer while on an extended odyssey of two years, often traveling by donkey or caravan visiting Russia, Persia, India, Burma, Thailand, Vietnam, Tibet, Hongkong and China.

His novel The Ninth November was banned and burned publicly.
Kellermann did not flee the country and offered no resistance, but wrote dime novels.
After the collapse of the Nazi dictatorship, Kellermann worked with Johannes R. Becher in the Cultural Association of the GDR.
He was a member of East Germany's Volkskammer as well as chairmen of the Society for German-Soviet Friendship.
His commitment in the postwar years to East Germany caused a boycott of West German booksellers.
His name was forgotten.
Even shortly before his death in 1951 he rallied the writers of both German states to push for unified deliberations.

Bernhard Kellermann is buried in the New Cemetery at Potsdam.   His grave is preserved.

Works 

 Yester und Li, novel (1904)
 Ingeborg, novel (1906)
 Der Tor, novel (1909)
 Das Meer [The Sea], novel (1910)
 Ein Spaziergang in Japan, Reisebericht [A Walk in Japan], travelogue (1910)
 Sassa yo Yassa. Japanische Tänze [Japanese Dances] (1911)
 Der Tunnel [The Tunnel], novel (1913)
 Der Krieg im Westen, Kriegsbericht [The war in the West, War Report] (1915)
 Krieg im Argonnerwald, Kriegsbericht [War in the Argonner Forest, War Report] (1916)
 Der 9. November [The Ninth of November], novel (1920)
 Die Heiligen [The Saints], novel (1922)
 Schwedenklees Erlebnis [Swedish Clover Experience] (1923)
 Die Brüder Schellenberg [The Brothers Schellenberg], novel (1925)
 Die Wiedertäufer von Münster [The Anabaptists of Muenster], drama (1925)
 Auf Persiens Karawanenstraßen [Persian Caravan Roads], travelogue (1928)
 Der Weg der Götter. Indien, Klein-Tibet, Siam [The Path of the Gods. India, Little Tibet, Siam], travelogue (1929)
 Die Stadt Anatol (City of Anatol), novel (1932)
 Jang-tse-kiang (1934)
 Lied der Freundschaft [Songs of Friendship] (1935)
 Das blaue Band [The Blue Band] (1938)
 Meine Reisen in Asien [My travels in Asia] (1940)
 Georg Wendlandts Umkehr [George Wendlandt's Reversal] (1941)
 Was sollen wir tun? [What are we to do?], essay (1945)
 Totentanz (1948)
 "Wir kommen aus Sowjetrußland" [We come from Soviet Russia], report (1948)

Posthumously 
 Bernhard Kellermann zum Gedenken. Aufsätze, Briefe, Reden 1945-1951 [Bernhard Kellermann in memory:  Essays, letters, speeches] (1952)

See also 
 The Tunnel (1935 film)

References

Further reading 
 Bożena Chołuj: Deutsche Schriftsteller im Banne der Novemberrevolution 1918 [German Writers During the November 1918 Revolution]. Bernhard Kellermann, Lion Feuchtwanger, Ernst Toller, Erich Mühsam, Franz Jung. Dt. Univ.-Verl., Wiesbaden 1991. .
 Christa Miloradovic-Weber: Der Erfinderroman 1850-1950. Zur literarischen Verarbeitung der technischen Zivilisation. Konstituierung eines literarischen Genres [The Novel Inventor 1850–1950. To literary processing of technical civilization. Constituting a literary genre]. Lang, Bern u.a. 1989. (= Zürcher germanistische Studien [Germanistic studies of Zurich]; 15) .
 Barbara Ohm: Bernhard Kellermann. Zum fünfzigsten Todestag des in Fürth geborenen  [On the fiftieth anniversary of the death of the author born in Fürth]. In: Fürther Heimatblätter, 51 (2001), S. 97-135.
 Fritz Reinert: "Was uns verbindet, ist das Leiden, das Erbe und das Schicksal Deutschlands." Notizen zu zwei Potsdamer Schriftstellern (1945–1949) ["What unites us is the passion, heritage and the fate of Germany", Notes to two Potsdam writers (1945–1949)]. In: Deutschland Archiv, Bielefeld, 32 (1999), S. 604-613.
 Uta Schaffers: Konstruktionen der Fremde. Erfahren, verschriftlicht und erlesen am Beispiel Japan [Constructions of the foreigner. Experienced, writing light and erlesen by the example Japan]. de Gruyter, Berlin u.a. 2006. (Spectrum literature science; 8) .
 Klaus Treuheit: Bernhard Kellermann. Der Moralist aus Fürth [Bernhard Kellermann. The moralist from Fürth]. In:  Visionäre aus Franken. Sechs phantastische Biographien [French Visionaries. Six Fantastic Biographies], hrsg. v. Bernd Flessner. Schmidt, Neustadt an der Aisch 2000. S. 101-112. .
 Volker Weidermann: Das Buch der verbrannten Bücher [The Book of Burned Books]. Köln: Verlag Kiepenheuer & Witsch, 2008; . (For Kellermann, see pages 93–95.)

External links 
 
 
 
 

1879 births
1951 deaths
People from Fürth
People from the Kingdom of Bavaria
Cultural Association of the GDR members
Members of the Provisional Volkskammer
Members of the 1st Volkskammer
East German writers
German essayists
German journalists
German male journalists
20th-century German novelists
20th-century German poets
German political writers
German science fiction writers
German travel writers
Writers from Bavaria
German male essayists
German male poets
German male novelists
20th-century essayists
Technical University of Munich alumni
Recipients of the National Prize of East Germany